is a 2009 Japanese biographical romantic drama film directed by Ryūichi Hiroki.

Plot
On April 5, 2007, a couple married in a church. At first glance, it was a typical wedding. The bride, however, was suffering from late-stage breast cancer and had been given only a month to live.

Cast 
 Nana Eikura: Chie Nagashima
 Eita: Taro Akasu
 Satomi Tezuka
 Misako Yasuda
 Akira Emoto

Notes 
Based on the true story of Chie Nagashima, a woman afflicted with breast cancer and her husband Taro Akasu.
Chie Nagashima's story was also told in a 2007 TBS documentary.

Reception 
April Bride was number one in the box office in its opening weekend. Mark Schilling of The Japan Times gave the film a mostly positive review.

References

External links 
  
 
 April Bride at Variety Japan

2009 films
2009 biographical drama films
Japanese biographical drama films
2000s Japanese-language films
Films directed by Ryūichi Hiroki
2009 drama films
2000s Japanese films